Geoffrey Marsh may refer to:
Charles L. Grant or Geoffrey Marsh (1942–2006), American writer
Geoffrey Marsh (museum director) (born 1957), director of the London Theatre Museum, now V&A Theatre Collections
Geoff Marsh (born 1958), Australian cricketer, coach, and selector

See also
Jeff "Swampy" Marsh (born 1960), American animator
Jeffrey Marsh (born 1977), American writer, activist and social media personality